Back on the Train may refer to:

Back on the Train, album by Electric Bluebirds and Bobby Valentino (British musician) 1996  
"Back on the Train", song by Phish, Marshall and Antonio from  Farmhouse (album)
"Back On the Train" by Toots & the Maytals
"Put Me on a Train Back to Texas" by Waylon Jennings / Willie Nelson Composed by Billy "Bass" Nelson / Jim Hurt / Roy Clayborne
Back on the Train Caroline Cotter 2008